David Wood may refer to:

Entertainment
 David Duffield Wood (1838–1910), American composer, educator, and musician
 David Wood (actor) (born 1944), English actor and playwright
 David Wood (New Zealand musician), musician with Straitjacket Fits

Politics
 David Wood (politician) (born 1961), member of the Missouri House of Representatives
 David Wood (environmental campaigner) (1963–2006), executive director of the GrassRoots Recycling Network

Sports
 David Wood (basketball) (born 1964), American professional basketball player
 David Wood (cricketer) (born 1965), English cricketer

Other
 David Wood (British Army officer) (1923–2009), British Army officer
 David Wood (journalist), American journalist
 David Wood (judge) (born 1948), British judge
 David Wood (mathematician) (born 1971), Australian mathematician
 David Wood (philosopher) (born 1946), professor of philosophy at Vanderbilt University
 David Leonard Wood (born 1957), American serial killer
 David Muir Wood (born 1949), author
 David Wood (Christian apologist) (born 1976), American evangelical apologist.

See also
David Woods (disambiguation)
List of people with surname Wood